

This is a list of county courthouses and other non-Federal courthouses in Texas, both current and former. For Federal courthouses located in Texas, see List of United States federal courthouses in Texas.

The U.S. state of Texas has 254 counties, the most of any U.S. state.  County borders and sizes were essentially set so that a courthouse would be within one day's travel, which, given slow transportation, meant many counties. States later developed have larger counties.  This is a list of county courthouses in the state of Texas, both current and former.  

The counties of Texas were each first served by a tree or tent before judicial functions moved into a log cabin.

Lead:
 Brief history of Texas counties
 What is a county courthouse?
 History of styles for Texas (county) courthouses
 Historical preservation of Texas's county courthouses

List 

Key

See also
List of United States federal courthouses in Texas
List of courthouses in the United States

Citations

References
 
 

Texas
Courthouses, county